The list of ship decommissionings in 1938 includes a chronological list of all ships decommissioned in 1938.


September

23 September 

 Taylor:  Decommissioned, served as a damage control hulk, later scrapped

See also 

1938
 
Ship